Christianne West (born February 1, 1999) is a Canadian curler from Iqaluit, Nunavut. She currently plays third on Team Sadie Pinksen.

Career
West played in eight Canadian Junior Curling Championships from 2013 to 2020 as third for Sadie Pinksen. Her best finish was a 2–7 record in 2016, 2018 and 2020. She also represented Nunavut at the 2015 Canada Winter Games, finishing in eleventh with a 2–6 record. In 2018, she won a bronze medal at the 2018 Arctic Winter Games.

While still in juniors, West got to participate in the 2018 Scotties Tournament of Hearts as the alternate for the Amie Shackleton rink. Originally listed as the team's alternate, West played in seven of the team's eight games and the team finished in last place with an 0–8 record.

Personal life
West is currently a child studies student at Carleton University.

Teams

References

External links

1999 births
Living people
Curlers from Nunavut
Canadian women curlers
People from Iqaluit
Carleton University alumni